Ategnatos is the eighth studio album by Swiss folk metal band Eluveitie. The album was released on 5 April 2019 through Nuclear Blast. It is their longest studio album to date.

Reception 

The album received positive reviews wherein the writers praised the musical quality and diversity of the band. It was also noted that songs like "Mine is the Fury" were harder and heavier than many previous releases of the band. with Metal Hammer calling it the first "true" Eluveitie album after five years. The reviewer for New Noise concluded, however, that "Ategnatos is a good album, though after Eluveitie’s long history and extensive discography, it’s an offering that doesn’t quite stand out from the rest of their catalog."

Track listing

Personnel

Eluveitie
 Chrigel Glanzmann – vocals, mandola, whistles
 Fabienne Erni – vocals, Celtic harp
 Matteo Sisti – bagpipes, Uilleann pipes, whistles, bodhrán
 Michalina Malisz – hurdy-gurdy
 Nicole Ansperger – fiddles
 Kay Brem – bass
 Jonas Wolf – rhythm guitar, resonator guitar
 Rafael Salzmann – lead guitar
 Alain Ackermann – drums, percussion

Guests
 Coen Strouken - viola
 Rebecca Thies - violin
 Sandrine Kindler-Chanson - violin
 Anne Jeger - cello
 Alexander Morton - narration (track 1, 3, and 14)
 Randy Blythe - additional vocals/narration (track 11)
 Meri Tadić - narration (track 12)

Charts

References

2019 albums
Eluveitie albums
Nuclear Blast albums